The goddess Chía (from the Chibcha language "the one who is like the moon"), is a triple lunar deity associated with gold, described as a beautiful young woman with white skin and black hair, in the religion of the Muisca who inhabited the Altiplano Cundiboyacense in pre-Columbian times. Of central importance to the pantheon, she was worshipped across various Muisca lands. 

In one of her many functions, Chía was considered to be the patron deity of the Zipa ruler, who governed the territory encompassing what is now Bogotá. Her ceremonial center was located in or around the city of Chía, Cundinamarca, which was aptly named after the goddess.

The chyquys; priests of the sacred calendar, were in charge of the ceremonies dedicated to the goddess, which included offerings of gold and ceramic artwork.

Súe 
Chía and Sué were the first generation of deities, created by Chiminigagua, in which they both illuminated light for earth. Chía and Súe, the solar deity, are married, but separated in the sky most of the time, until Chía would join with her husband creating a Lunar eclipse.

See also 

 Moon Temple
 List of lunar deities

References

Muisca goddesses
Pre-Columbian mythology and religion
Lunar goddesses
Triple goddesses
Muysccubun